Tiguipa may refer to:
 Tiguipa (wasp), a genus of wasps in the family Crabronidae
 Tigüipa, a town in Bolivia
 Tiguipa Airport